Tangerine Dream is the sixth studio album by Swedish singer-songwriter Miss Li, released on 10 October 2012.

Track listing
Teenager for Life - 3:47
Plastic Faces - 3:13
Respected Old Man - 3:27
Golden Retriever - 3:44
All Those Men - 3:05
A Darker Side of Me - 3:42
It Ain't Over - 2:47
My Heart Goes Boom - 3:24
Throw It in the Trash Can - 3:20
Clever Words - 5:4

Charts

Weekly charts

Year-end charts

References

2012 albums
Miss Li albums